This is a list of the national sites and monuments of cultural and historic value that are indexed by the Moroccan ministry of culture.
 
The ministry classified the national sites and monuments in Morocco into two different lists. One list for monuments and another one for buildings.

See also 
 List of museums in Morocco

References 

 
Morocco
Sites and monuments